The 1999–2000 Ottawa Senators season was the eighth season of the Ottawa Senators of the National Hockey League (NHL). This season saw the Senators drop in the standings, as they finished with 95 points, down from the 103 they registered the previous season. They finished second in the Northeast Division and sixth in the Eastern Conference. They qualified for the Stanley Cup playoffs for the fourth straight season.

Regular season
This season is remembered by fans as the season that star forward Alexei Yashin decided to sit out due to his contract.  He was entering the final year of a five-year contract that he signed with Ottawa in 1995. However, Yashin demanded a large pay raise after his impressive 1998–99 season and set a deadline that the Senators had to offer him a new contract, or he would miss the entire season.  The Senators opted not to sign him, and Yashin sat out the entire 1999–2000 season.

With the loss of Yashin, Daniel Alfredsson was named captain, and, despite missing 25 games due to various injuries, he scored 59 points, behind only Radek Bonk's 60 points in team scoring. Marian Hossa tied Shawn McEachern for the team lead in goals, with 29.

The Senators traded goaltender Damian Rhodes to the Atlanta Thrashers as part of a deal during the 1999 NHL Expansion Draft, and acquired Patrick Lalime from the Mighty Ducks of Anaheim to split goaltending duties with Ron Tugnutt. Tugnutt had a sub-par season by his standards, and was dealt to the Pittsburgh Penguins for two-time Stanley Cup champion goaltender Tom Barrasso at the trade deadline.

Final standings

Playoffs
Barrasso was the starting goalie going into the playoffs. However, it was a short stay for the goaltender, as the Senators were eliminated in six games in the first round by their provincial rivals, the Toronto Maple Leafs. The series was the first Ottawa–Toronto Stanley Cup series since 1922, when the original Senators defeated the St. Patricks in an NHL playoff.

Toronto was the higher seed and drew home ice advantage. The first five games were all won by the home team. The Maple Leafs won 4–2 in Game 6 at Ottawa to win the series four games to two.

Schedule and results

Regular season

Eastern Conference Quarterfinals: vs. (3) Toronto Maple Leafs

Toronto wins series 4-2

Player statistics

Regular season
Scoring

Goaltending

Playoffs
Scoring

Goaltending

Awards and records
 Molson Cup - Marian Hossa

Transactions

Trades

Waivers

Expansion draft

Source:

Draft picks
Ottawa's draft picks at the 1999 NHL Entry Draft in Boston, Massachusetts.

Farm teams
 Grand Rapids Griffins (International Hockey League)
 Mobile Mysticks (East Coast Hockey League)

See also
1999–2000 NHL season

References

Ottawa Senators Media Guide 2007
The Internet Hockey Database
National Hockey League Guide & Record Book 2007

Ottawa Senators seasons
Ottawa Senators season, 1999-2000
Ottawa